Midland may refer to:

Places

Australia
 Midland, Western Australia

Canada
 Midland, Albert County, New Brunswick
 Midland, Kings County, New Brunswick
 Midland, Newfoundland and Labrador
 Midland, Ontario

India
 Midland Ward, Kohima, Nagaland

Ireland
 Midland Region, Ireland

United States
 Midland, Arkansas
 Midland, California
 Midoil, California, formerly Midland
 Midland, Georgia
 Midland, Indiana
 Midland, Kentucky
 Midland, Louisiana
 Midland, Maryland
 Midland, Michigan
 Midland, Missouri
 Midland, North Carolina
 Midlands of South Carolina
 Midland, Ohio
 Midland, Oregon
 Midland, Pennsylvania
 Midland, South Dakota
 Midland, Tennessee
 Midland, Texas
 Midland, Virginia
 Midland, Washington
 Midland City, Alabama

Railways
 Buenos Aires Midland Railway, a former British-owned railway company in Argentina
 Colorado Midland Railway, US
 Florida Midland Railroad (disambiguation), US
 Midland Railroad (Massachusetts), US
 Midland Railway, a former railway company in the UK 
 Midland Railway of Canada, a former railway company in eastern Canada
 Midland Railway of Western Australia, a former railway company in Western Australia
 Midland (TTC), a rapid transit stop in Scarborough, Ontario, Canada
 New Zealand Midland Railway Company, a former railway company

Schools
 Midland High School (disambiguation)
 Midland School, Los Olivos, California, US
 Midland School, North Branch, New Jersey, US
 Midland University, Fremont, Nebraska, US

Other uses
 Midland (band), a country music group
 Midland (DJ), a London DJ
 Midland (electoral district), an electoral district in Manitoba, Canada
 Midland American English, a regional dialect
 Midland Bank, a former high street bank in the UK, now renamed HSBC Bank
 Midland District (South Australian Legislative Council), electoral district
 Midland F1 Racing, a former Formula One racing team
 Midland Group, a Russian construction team, owners of Midland F1
 Midland Holdings, one of the largest real estate agents in Hong Kong
 Midland Radio, an American manufacturer of wireless two way radio equipment
 Midland Credit Management, Inc. an American debt buyer
 The Midland (magazine), regional magazine in the United States

See also
 Mittellandkanal, the Midland Canal, Germany
 Midland City (disambiguation)
 Midland County (disambiguation)
 Midland Township (disambiguation)
 Midland Airport (disambiguation)
 Midland Hotel (disambiguation)
 Midlands (disambiguation)